Julie Elizabeth Smith, Baroness Smith of Newnham (born 1 June 1969) is an academic specialising in European politics and a Liberal Democrat politician. From 2003 to 2015, she was a local councillor on Cambridge City Council. Since September 2014, she has been a life peer and a member of the House of Lords.

Early life
Smith was born on 1 June 1969. From 1980 to 1987, she was educated at Merchant Taylors' Girls' School, an all-girls selective private school based in Great Crosby, Merseyside. After taking a gap year, she studied Philosophy, Politics and Economics at Brasenose College, Oxford and graduated with a Bachelor of Arts (BA) degree. She then undertook postgraduate study in politics at St Antony's College, Oxford, graduating with a Master of Philosophy (MPhil) degree and a Doctor of Philosophy (DPhil) degree. Her doctoral thesis was titled "Direct elections to the European Parliament: a reevaluation" and was submitted in 1995. Having been awarded a Hanseatic Scholarship, she undertook further study in Hamburg from 1995 to 1997.

Career

Academic career
Smith began her academic career lecturing in the International Relations and European Studies Department of the Central European University, an English-language university in Budapest, Hungary. In 1997, she joined the University of Cambridge as a lecturer in European politics. She was later promoted to senior lecturer in International Relations and became a Fellow of Robinson College. From 1999 to 2003, she was additionally the head of the European Programme at Chatham House. She was made a Reader in European Politics in October 2018.

Political career
Smith is a Liberal Democrat politician. From 2003 to May 2015, she was a local councillor representing Newnham on Cambridge City Council. She is also a vice-chair of the Liberal Democrats Federal Policy Committee.

In August 2014, it was announced that Smith would be made a life peer. On 12 September 2014 she was created Baroness Smith of Newnham, of Crosby in the County of Merseyside. She made her maiden speech in the House of Lords on the same day.

Involvement in EU Referendum
As demonstrated by the topic of Smith's maiden speech, she is firmly convinced of the benefits that the EU brings to the UK.

She has now taken an active involvement in Cambridge for Europe, a campaign which wants "to spread a positive message regarding the UK's continued involvement in the EU". Smith is one of the group's leading patrons.

Selected works

References

External links
Personal website

1969 births
Living people
People educated at Merchant Taylors' Girls' School
Alumni of Brasenose College, Oxford
Alumni of St Antony's College, Oxford
Fellows of Robinson College, Cambridge
British political scientists
British women academics
Councillors in Cambridgeshire
Liberal Democrats (UK) councillors
Liberal Democrats (UK) life peers
Academic staff of Central European University
Chatham House people
Women political scientists
Women councillors in England
Life peeresses created by Elizabeth II